FIB Champions Cup (or Edsbyn Champions Cup) is an international (pre-season) bandy tournament held annually in September on indoor Dina-Arena in Edsbyn, Sweden from 2004 when 8 strongest clubs from Sweden (6 from Elitserien) and Russia (2) competed for the cup for the first time. Next year the format was changed expanding the number of participants to 12 (eight Swedish and four Russian). Russian champions Vodnik (in 2005) and Dynamo Moscow (2005, 2007, 2009) did not participate in the tournament – vacancies were filled by other Swedish clubs, and, once by Tornio (ToPV) (2005) from Finland.

Editions

References

International bandy competitions
Sport in Edsbyn
2004 establishments in Sweden
Recurring sporting events established in 2004
September sporting events